The 2011–12 season was Port Vale's 100th season of football in the English Football League, and fourth successive season in League Two. It marked the start of Micky Adams' second spell in charge of the club, and despite fan unrest with the board, Vale fans and players were hopeful of promotion come the end of the season. However a ten-point deduction for entering administration doomed the club to a mid-table finish. They exited both the League Cup and Football League Trophy at the First Round following defeats to League One clubs. They also crashed out of the FA Cup at the First Round against non-league opposition.

Behind the scenes, former chairman Bill Bratt left the club, as a new look board was installed, consisting of chairman Peter Miller, vice-chairman Mike Lloyd, CEO Perry Deakin, and Glenn Oliver; with only Oliver having any connection to the previous Valiant2001 regime. In September, this new board announced that sports construction firm Blue Sky International were planning to invest £8 million into the club. However doubts quickly began to emerge over the deal, and in December the CEO of Blue Sky confirmed that the company had never agreed to any such deal, and that they would not be investing any money into the club.

The club's financial problems and boardroom infighting left Adams unable to strengthen his squad during the January transfer window, thereby making promotion an unlikely goal by the half-way stage. The club was unable to pay the player's wages in February. On 29 February, HM Revenue and Customs issued the club with a winding up petition. The club entered administration on 9 March. On 4 April, the administrators revealed Keith Ryder to be the preferred bidder, though he never completed the deal.

Overview

League Two
The return of Micky Adams meant that Vale could enter the pre-season looking to improve the playing squad, rather than search for a new manager. His first signings of the season were former Glenn Hoddle Academy youngsters Ryan Burge and Ben Williamson, a midfielder and striker respectively. Adams' notoriously tough pre-season training regime began in earnest, though the players reported that they had come to expect the hard work come summertime and Adams himself was pleased with the condition his players began the pre-season in. Adams built on his new youth policy with the signatures of Sheffield United duo Kingsley James and Phil Roe; as well as Walsall defender Clayton McDonald, and left-back Mike Green. The club undertook a tour of North America for the first time in its history, where they recorded victories over USL Premier Development League sides North Sound SeaWolves, Tacoma Tide, Kitsap Pumas, and Victoria Highlanders. Following this tour, Justin Richards made a surprise exit to Burton Albion – this left namesake Marc as the club's senior player at the relatively young age of 29, in one of the club's youngest ever squads. To replace the departing striker former loanee – and self-confirmed Vale supporter – Tom Pope was signed from Rotherham United.

Vale began the season with a run of four games unbeaten, picking up easy wins over Accrington Stanley and Barnet and hard-fought draws with Crawley Town and Burton Albion, before finishing August with a 3–2 defeat to Southend United. Following a spate of injuries Adams signed Rangers and Northern Ireland utility player Andrew Little on a four-month loan. With 25 goals in the first six league games, Vale players found scoring goals easy, but the strength of the previous season – defending – seemed to have left them. In September, a brace from Rob Taylor and late winner from Pope were enough to beat Bradford City, as Vale climbed into the automatic promotion places. On 22 September 2011, Adams signed free agent Rob Kozluk on a short-term contract until 1 January 2012, and also brought in Liam Chilvers on a month's loan from Notts County (a loan deal later extended to 24 December); both players were signed to bolster Vale's struggling defence. The pair made their débuts two days later, as Vale earned a 1–1 draw with local rivals Crewe Alexandra at the Alexandra Stadium – Pope finding an equaliser just two minutes after Byron Moore gave the "Railwaymen" the lead.

However, after scoring in all of their first fifteen league and cup games, a 4–0 home defeat by Morecambe sent the "Valiants" down to eleventh place; in doing so the "Shrimps" avenged the 7–2 defeat inflicted upon them at the Globe Arena on the penultimate day of the 2010–11 season. Andrew Little returned to parent club Rangers after the game, having damaged his knee ligaments during the defeat. Mike Green also left the club after asking to have his contract terminated following a loan spell at Eastleigh. After a run of five games without a win – which included 388 minutes without scoring a goal – Adams signed Cameroonian striker Guy Madjo and winger Jennison Myrie-Williams on loan from Stevenage, as well as Irish defender Shane O'Connor on loan from Ipswich Town. The two Stevenage loanees scored a goal a piece against struggling Dagenham & Redbridge on 10 December, to give the Vale their first win in more than six weeks. Supporters showed their disapproval against the board by displaying red cards in the home fixture against Aldershot Town, a game in which Madjo scored a hat-trick. Following this match, both Roe and McDonald were signed until the end of the season, whilst Kozluk was released. On 30 December, midfield playmaker Gary Roberts had his contract terminated following two serious breaches of club discipline in the space of three months. Nominated for the Manager of the Month award for three wins in four December games, Adams revealed that due to the club's precarious financial position he was unable to sign any new players or even retain his loan players in the January transfer window – despite the chairman having previously told him to draw up a list of transfer targets. Contract negotiations were also put on hold.

In addition to off-the-field troubles in January, Adams also had to deal with an injury crisis to his small squad; already missing Ryan Burge and Lewis Haldane with long-term injuries, the treatment room also welcomed Marc Richards, Rob Taylor, Gareth Owen, Tom Pope and Lee Collins. Vale suffered four consecutive defeats, before managing to turn things around by the end of the month with 1–0 wins over Rotherham United and Plymouth Argyle. On 14 February, midfielders Chris Shuker and Paul Marshall joined the club on non-contract terms. However the treatment room grew more busy, as Adam Yates and Tom Pope picked up injuries requiring several weeks of rest. The club expected to receive a boost when Trinidad and Tobago international Chris Birchall returned from the Los Angeles Galaxy to play for the club on a month-by-month basis; however the club were hit by a transfer embargo by the Football League on 25 February for failing to pay a bill. Nevertheless performances on the pitch were solid, and Vale entered the Crewe derby having won four and drawn one of their last five games. The derby finished honours even again at 1–1, with a late header from Byron Moore cancelling out the own goal scored by Crewe skipper David Artell. A 2–1 home defeat by Barnet on 10 March ended Vale's run of eight game unbeaten; combined with a ten-point deduction for entering administration, the club slipped from 9th to 14th in the space of 24 hours. Promising young defender Lee Collins was the first the leave the club post-administration, joining Championship side Barnsley on a loan deal worth £50,000 to the Vale on 15 March. The drama continued in the game against Shrewsbury Town on 27 March, as the match was abandoned after 64 minutes due to a fire caused by the failure of the floodlights at the New Meadow. With the season drawing to a close, Adams began developing his squad for the following season, and announced that he had 'reluctantly' released defender Charlie Raglan, without giving him his first team debut. He offered contracts to all but three players: Chris Martin, Phil Roe, and Paul Marshall; he also placed Burge on the transfer list. Aside from Lee Collins, the first player to reject a contract with Vale to move elsewhere was Anthony Griffith, who signed a two-year deal with League One side Leyton Orient. The first out-of-contract players to pledge their futures to Port Vale were Rob Taylor (two years), Lewis Haldane (six months), Ben Williamson (one year), and Sam Johnson (one year). Days later it was announced that Sean Rigg had signed with Oxford United, whilst Clayton McDonald confirmed that he would accept Vale's offer of a new one-year deal. However the biggest blow to fan's hopes of promotion came when it was announced that talismanic top-scorer Marc Richards had signed a two-year deal with relegated League One side Chesterfield. June began with John McCombe and Tom Pope both agreeing to sign new deals with the club. The only player to reject the club's offer of a new contract despite not signing a contract elsewhere was goalkeeper Stuart Tomlinson; he eventually ended up at Burton Albion.

Finances & ownership issues
On the financial side, hostilities were renewed between Bill Bratt's board and some supporters' groups. The North London Valiants rejected a seat on the board after dismissing the offer as "hollow and disingenuous". Bratt resigned as chairman on 29 July, citing a desire to unite the fans, and was replaced by Mike Lloyd. The board of directors at the start of the campaign consisted of: Mike Lloyd (as chairman), Glenn Oliver, Bill Bratt MBE, and Micky Adams (serving as both manager and director). Matchday tickets for adult fans were priced between £20.50 and £21.50 – the highest minimum price for an adult in the division – though a BBC survey placed Vale Park as the eighth priciest venue in the league when food and drink were also factored into the equation. Fan unrest emerged on the opening day of the season, as some 500 protesters campaigned outside the ground during the draw with Crawley Town, before putting their views toward new chairman Mike Lloyd when he came to hear their views. Bratt then announced that he would step down as a director in September following planned investment from an anonymous group. This news was enough to end protests by fan group 'Black and Gold Until It's Sold', as the group waited for Valiant2001's influence in the boardroom to cease completely. In September 2011, the anonymous investors were revealed to be sports construction firm Blue Sky International, who planned to plough £5 million into the club in twelve months, as well as a further £2.5 million by 2016. This sum would secure the long-term future of the club.

Following the announcement of the Blue Sky investment, club CEO Perry Deakin announced his intention to purchase £100,000 of shares to replace Bill Bratt on the board of directors. Peter Miller, vice-president of the sports and education division of Global Events Group, a consultancy firm based in Atlanta, Georgia, also bought a £250,000 stake in the club. As a result of the imminent investment and departure of the Valiant2001 directors, fan groups 'North London Valiants' and 'Black and Gold Until It's Sold' announced a cease-fire in their protests. 'North London Valiants' representative Malcolm Hirst said that "We feel the time has come to forget our political differences and move forward together"; whilst a 'Black and Gold' spokesman said that "Sadly, the dream of a fan-owned democratically run club proved beyond our reach and we have to accept that the smaller shareholders will not have any influence on the future direction of the club. The promise of a supporter director on the board is, however, a significant compromise." The day after these announcements Longsdon businessman Mark Sims, who had been voted onto the board four months earlier at the club's EGM, withdrew his candidacy after refusing to take on the required financial guarantees. That same day Bill Bratt resigned from the board completely, and was replaced by as a director by CEO Perry Deakin. Peter Miller (formerly of Luton Town) was voted onto the board on 24 October. Miller was also elected chairman seven days later, with Mike Lloyd becoming vice-chairman.

In November the club were threatened with legal action by Ameriturf, a rival company of Blue Sky that had previously been looking to invest in the club and that had sponsored the pre-season tour of America. Adams stepped down as a director on 5 November, the day of his 100th game in charge at Port Vale. However eleven days later, doubts began to emerge over the Blue Sky deal, as it was revealed that the deal may not go ahead due to 'contractual issues'. Fan groups criticised the board for their lack of transparency on the issue. More fierce criticism came when The Sentinel reported that neither Miller or Deakin had actually purchased £350,000 worth of shares as they had reported just before they were elected onto the board; a spokesman for the supporters' club said that "I think Mr Miller and Mr Deakin should be removed from the board. In my opinion, they were elected under false pretences." It was also revealed that the club had agreed to pay Miller a salary of £100,000 a year (former chairman Bill Bratt was unpaid, though received a £50,000 salary as CEO). Peter Miller issued a statement on the Port Vale website decrying the paper's reporting as being "misleading and unhelpful", and stating that whilst "it is common knowledge", he could "confirm, beyond all doubt, that these sums have been lodged and £350,000 has been received by Port Vale Football Club for our [Deakin and Miller's] respective shareholdings." Former director Stan Meigh called on Miller to resign. Supporters group 'North London Valiants' further discovered that Deakin and Miller had used their 'nil-paid' shares to vote each other onto the board, as well as the 'nil-paid' shares from Blue Sky (this totalled as £500,000 worth of unpaid for shares); combined with 'yes' votes from directors Mike Lloyd and Glenn Oliver this rendered voting from other shareholders a mooted exercise. As these facts were revealed, former prospective investor Mo Chaudry offered to lay on hospitality for the Roy Sproson statue unveiling ceremony, as the club had refused to provide refreshments for former players and Sproson family members. On 8 December, Hank Julicher, CEO of Blue Sky International made the following statement:

Miller said that this statement was a "blatant misrepresentation of the facts". In October, Blue Sky had announced a ten-year £1.25m sponsorship deal with Yeovil Town. The board responded with another statement on the club's website, and provided documented evidence to prove that Blue Sky did in fact apply for £150,000 of shares and did vote for Miller and Deakin to join the club as directors. Julicher responded by saying "we haven't paid so how the hell do we own shares?" He further said that he backed out of any deal when he was told to pay money upfront and when his own negotiations were ignored: "Peter Miller would just put things off. Finally we had a meeting at Crewe Hall and I said to him 'Where's this stuff, baby? Where's the beef?' But he didn't have any answers, so I said 'It's over'." The club then issued another strongly worded statement, condemning Julicher's "stream of dangerous inaccuracy" and The Sentinel for their "subjective agenda". However the Supporters' Club voted in favour of another EGM to remove the Miller-led board, as the contract with Blue Sky was revealed, confirming Julicher's words that the company were only ever planning to invest £500,000 in synthetic training pitches. In the December home game against Aldershot Town, 80% of Vale fans in attendance took part in the 'red card' protest against the board. Deakin announced his resignation from the position as CEO on Christmas Eve, claiming that: "Over the last two or three months I have accepted advice from certain individuals at the club about what is best for Port Vale. I am extremely upset and angry about the position I have been placed in through no fault of my own. It is an impossible position."

On 28 December, The Sentinel reported that 22 days earlier a £277,000 mortgage was taken out on Vale Park to pay for day-to-day operations. The next day, Deakin, Lloyd and Oliver announced that they had "carried out a review of Miller... and decided his tenure [as chairman] should cease" at the end of the calendar year. The leader of Stoke-on-Trent City Council, Mohammed Pervez, told reporters that he was "concerned" about the club's ability to repay a £2.25 million loan taken out in 2006, and also confirmed that the mortgage the club had taken out in December breached the loan agreement with the council. In addition to board members, The Sentinel's Martin Tideswell also criticised local MP Joan Walley, the local council, the FA, and the Football League for not acting to protect the club from its directors: "they fiddle and talk in platitudes while Vale Park burns." Meanwhile the club's directors announced that the club's AGM would be held on 13 March, having twice postponed the meeting traditionally held in December. On 25 January, fan groups organised an interim board consisting of Pete Williams (supporters' club chairman); Margaret Sinstadt; Mike Thompstone and Paul Humphreys (both of whom former directors who resigned during the 2010–11 campaign) – the former two finding sponsors with at least a £50,000 stake, and the latter two not requiring a stake due to their status as former directors. Six days later, Ameriturf announced that they would again be interested in investing into the club. However the company that produced the club's matchday programmes threatened the club with legal action after they were allegedly misled over sales figures. In February, Stoke-on-Trent city council confirmed that for the first time the club had missed its monthly repayments of around £19,000 for a £2.25 million loan taken out in 2006. On 25 February, the club were hit with a transfer embargo after failing to payca tax bill, leaving fears of administration more acute than ever following the club's exit from administration in 2003. Peter Miller then quit the board, leaving just three directors; meanwhile club sponsors Harlequin Property began suing the club over the repayment of a £125,000 loan, and the city council confirmed that it was still owed £9,033 in unpaid loan payments. The players were not paid in February. On 29 February, HM Revenue and Customs issued the club with a winding up petition. Two days later the council proposed putting the club into administration, which was by then the club's only chance of survival. Perry Deakin told the media that he regretted ever getting involved with the club, but laid the blame for the club's collapse at the hands of former chairman Bill Bratt; his parting comment was "Perhaps in hindsight I was a bit naive. I had a look at the club's website and there didn't appear to be any issues there. I guess I should have looked at The Sentinel's site."

Administration
The club entered administration on 9 March 2012. Stoke-on-Trent City Council agreed to pay £500,000 to cover running costs for the next three months, and also agreed to pay the estimated £100,000 administrators' fee. The administrators were Begbies Traynor, headed by Bob Young (the same "Administrator Man" who took charge in 2003); Young was assisted by Gerald Krasner and Steve Currie. The administrators appointed Wasserman Media Group's Ben Mansford to try and sell the club's players to any interested parties. They also made four redundancies: Hayley Wright (commercial manager), John Baines (media officer), Paula Jones (PA), and Perry Deakin – Deakin had claimed to have announced his resignation weeks ago, but was actually still on the payroll. On 4 April, the administrators revealed Lancashire businessman Keith Ryder to be the preferred bidder, ahead of bids from Mo Chaudry and several other interested parties. Fans expressed surprise at the decision, but were optimistic of a bright future under Ryder. It was revealed that Ryder had loaned the club £100,000 to stay afloat in February. It was also announced that the City council were to lose £1 million of the £1.8 million the club owed the authority, whilst other creditors received a mere 3p in the £1 for the rest of the £2.7 million debt. Aside from the council and Ryder, the two other significant creditors (owed more than £50,000) were Gibraltar-based loan company Continental Solutions Limited (£277,734) and HMRC (£189,965). More unexpected creditors included £15 of expenses owed to Perry Deakin, £3,550 owed to Rangers and £70 owed to S&A Pet Discs. Ryder revealed himself to be a Manchester United supporter with a keen interest in football; a quiet man, he put forward realistic aims for the club and a wish to keep footballing matters up to Micky Adams. By 6 July, he was allowed to complete his takeover, though he never did.

Cup competitions
In the FA Cup, Vale faced a home tie with Grimsby Town, a side struggling in the Conference National. A goalless draw meant the Vale had to find victory at Blundell Park to progress. Conference South side Salisbury City awaited in the Second Round, meaning that Vale only had to beat two non-league sides to progress to a potentially lucrative Third Round tie. In the replay, Vale were forced to play in the colours of rivals Stoke City, due to a clash of kits. A Serge Makofo goal was enough to settle the tie, as Vale exited the competition at the First Round for the first time since 2002. Micky Adams said he was "disappointed and embarrassed" and "I'm angry and disappointed with certain players and a little bit bewildered"; he also criticised the referee for allowing the goal despite the fact that Makofo handled the ball. He went on to say that "All leave has been cancelled, there's no more days off. It's double-session time every day until we get it right."

In the League Cup, Vale fell at the first hurdle to highly fancied League One side Huddersfield Town; the "Valiants" took the lead with a Gary Roberts effort, before the "Terriers" recovered to leave Burslem with a 4–2 win.

In the Football League Trophy, Vale exited at the First Round to League One Tranmere Rovers following a shoot-out at Prenton Park; Chris Martin scored a penalty and saved one, however misses by Pope and Roberts proved costly – ironically the pair had only been brought on as last minute substitutes to take penalties. This meant that Vale had been eliminated from the competition after a defeat in the penalty shoot-out for the third consecutive season. Adams paid little heed to the result though, as he was more concerned with Lewis Haldane, who had to be stretchered off the field with a broken leg.

Results

Football League Two

League table

Results by matchday

Matches

FA Cup

League Cup

League Trophy

Squad statistics

Appearances and goals

Top scorers

Disciplinary record

Sourced from Soccerway.

Awards

Transfers

Transfers in

Transfers out

Loans in

Loans out

References
Specific

General
Soccerbase

Port Vale F.C. seasons
Port Vale